Competition is any rivalry between two or more parties.

Compete may also refer to:
 Compete.com, a web traffic analysis company, 2000–2016
 Compete America, an industry trade group
 Compete Magazine, an American monthly LGBT sports magazine

See also 
Non-compete clause, a term in contract law where a person agrees not to compete